Gold Eagle Guy is a 1934 Broadway five scene drama written by Melvin Levy, 
produced by the Group Theatre with D. A. Doran, Jr., staged by Lee Strasberg, 
choreography by Helen Tamiris with scenic design by Donald Oenslager and costume design by Kay Morrison. It ran for 65 performances from November 28, 1934, to January 1935 at the Morosco Theatre.

Cast

 Luther Adler as Emperor Norton and as Tang Sin
 Stella Adler as Adah Menken
 Alan Baxter as MacNaurty and as Kohler and as postman
 Roman Bohnen as Macondray
 J. Edward Bromberg as Guy Button
 Morris Carnovsky as Will Parrott
 William Challee as Pearly and as Ah Kee
 Russell Collins as a deserter and as Ed Walker
 Walter Coy as Adam Keane
 Jules Garfield as sailor and as Mackay
 Elia Kazan as Polyziodes
 Alexander Kirkland as Lon Firth
 Lewis Leverett as a miner	and as Captain Roberts and as André
 Bob Lewis as Gus and as Okajima
 Sanford Meisner as Ortega and as 	Guy, Jr. (in  Act 3)
 Clifford Odets as	Burns and as Jolais
 Art Smith as Merg and as Wallin
 Margaret Barker as Jessie Sargent
 Jackie Jordan as Guy, Jr. (in Act 2)
 David Kortchmar as another miner and as Rev. Brown
 Gerrit Kraber as Tony Sorrenson and as Joe
 Herbert Ratner as bartender and as Jacobs and as A.D.T. boy
 Marietta Bitter as harpist Miss Grackle
 Jack Kaiser as Accordion Ed

Girls of the "Mantic" barroom

 Ruth Nelson and as Mrs. McElvay and as Miss Richards
 Phoebe Brand and as Elizabeth Jolais
 Joan Madison and as Mrs. Muller
 Paula Miller and as Mrs. Sheldon and as Mrs. Nass
 Florence Cooper and as Mrs. DaSilva
 Evelyn Geller 
 Helen Carrm and as Mrs. Halstead
 Eunice Stoddard and as Mrs. Lemon and as Frances Williams and as Mrs. Kummer and as Mrs. Guadalla
 Dorothy Patten and as Miss Simmonds

References
 
 Playbill Vault Gold Eagle Guy

External links 
 

1934 plays
Broadway plays
Plays set in California
San Francisco in fiction